Party of Salvadoran Workers (Partido de los Trabajadores Salvadoreños) is a political party in El Salvador. The general secretary of PTS is Leonel Ovidio Calderón. A prominent PTS member is Mario Aguiñada Carranza, who used to be the leader of Unión Democrática Nacionalista.

Political parties in El Salvador